The 1969–70 South-West Indian Ocean cyclone season was an active cyclone season.



Systems

Severe Tropical Storm Aline

Aline existed from August 19 to August 22.

Tropical Cyclone Blanche

October 7 to October 15.

Moderate Tropical Storm Corrine

26 deaths in Comoros and Mozambique.

Moderate Tropical Storm Delphine

Delphine existed from December 29 to January 1.

Tropical Cyclone Diane–Francoise

This system entered the basin on January 7 and dissipated on January 17.

Moderate Tropical Storm Eliane

The storm struck western Madagascar, bringing rainfall.

Tropical Cyclone Genevieve

Four deaths in Madagascar due to flooding.

Tropical Cyclone Hermine

One death on Reunion.

Very Intense Tropical Cyclone Harriet-Iseult

Iseult existed from February 2 to February 15.

Very Intense Tropical Cyclone Josephine-Jane

It was named Josephine in its formative stages due to being in what was considered the Australian basin at the time.

Moderate Tropical Storm Katia

Katia existed from March 16 to March 26.

Tropical Cyclone Louise

Louise existed from March 20 to April 1.

Tropical Cyclone Kathy–Michelle

Michelle entered the basin on March 24 and dissipated on March 30.

See also

 Atlantic hurricane seasons: 1969, 1970
 Eastern Pacific hurricane seasons: 1969, 1970
 Western Pacific typhoon seasons: 1969, 1970
 North Indian Ocean cyclone seasons: 1969, 1970

References

South-West Indian Ocean cyclone seasons